A Masonic Lodge is a basic organizational unit in Freemasonry.

Masonic Lodge may also refer to one of several specific buildings:
Masonic Lodge No. 238, Dalton, Georgia, listed on the National Register of Historic Places (NRHP)
Masonic Lodge (Grandin, Missouri), listed on the NRHP
Masonic Lodge (Missoula, Montana), listed on the NRHP
Masonic Lodge No. 472, Zaleski, Ohio, listed on the NRHP
Masonic Lodge 570, San Angelo, Texas, listed on the NRHP
Masonic Lodge Building (Kirkland, Washington), listed on the NRHP

Australia
Charters Towers Masonic Lodge, Queensland
Isis Masonic Lodge, Childers, Queensland
Mount Perry Masonic Lodge, Queensland

See also
Masonic Temple (disambiguation)
Masonic Hall (disambiguation)
Masonic Building (disambiguation)
List of Masonic buildings